Taribo West (born 26 March 1974) is a Nigerian pastor and former professional footballer who played as a defender. He is best remembered for his various unusual and colourful hairstyles.

After winning several major trophies with Auxerre in French football, West went on to play for both Milanese clubs, Inter Milan and AC Milan. He also appeared in the top-level leagues of England and Germany.

At international level, West won 42 caps for Nigeria between 1994 and 2005, taking part in two World Cups and two African Championships. He also represented his country at the 1996 Olympics, winning a gold medal.

Club career

Early years
Born in Port Harcourt, West was discovered by Monday Sinclair, who recruited him to play for Sharks. He started playing professionally with Obanta United in 1989, before returning to Sharks in 1990. West then played for Enugu Rangers in 1991, before joining Julius Berger in 1992.

Auxerre
Following successful trials in early 1993, West joined French side Auxerre led by Guy Roux. He was on the bench during a 2–2 UEFA Cup draw against Tenerife on 15 September 1993, but failed to make his debut. West eventually played his first competitive game for the club in a 0–0 away league draw at Toulouse on 5 March 1994. He became a first team regular in the following season, making 31 appearances in all competitions. In the 1995–96 season, West helped Auxerre win their first league title in the club's history, alongside such players as Laurent Blanc and Sabri Lamouchi, among others. They also won the national cup, thus collecting the double. West subsequently made seven appearances in the 1996–97 UEFA Champions League, as the club was eliminated in the quarter-finals by the eventual champions Borussia Dortmund.

Inter Milan and AC Milan
In June 1997, West was transferred to Italian side Inter Milan, on a four-year deal. He made his competitive debut for the club in a 1–0 Coppa Italia victory over Foggia on 3 September 1997. Subsequently, West scored his first goal for Inter in a 2–1 Serie A win against Atalanta on 9 November 1997. He also scored the extra time winning goal against Schalke 04 in the 1997–98 UEFA Cup quarter-finals. Eventually, Inter won the competition led by Ronaldo and Iván Zamorano, with West being sent off in the final against Lazio. In the next season, West made 21 league appearances, as the club missed securing a spot in UEFA competitions. He failed to make any appearance in the 1999–2000 season, being three times an unused substitute.

In the 2000 winter transfer window, West switched to Inter's crosstown rivals AC Milan. He made his debut for the club on 24 March 2000, coming on as an injury time substitute for Andriy Shevchenko in 2–0 win over Juventus. On 14 May 2000, West managed to score his only goal for Milan in a 4–0 victory over Udinese.

England and Germany
In November 2000, West moved to English club Derby County, on an initial three-month loan. He made his debut for the Rams on 18 November 2000, playing the full 90 minutes in a 2–0 home league win over Bradford City which was Derby's first league win of the season. In January 2001, West signed an extension to stay with the Derbyshire side until the end of the 2000–01 season. He helped the team avoid relegation, making 18 appearances, as Derby won 31 out of their 42 total points with him in the lineup. In May 2001, West eventually left the club because his "international commitments".

In November 2001, West joined German club 1. FC Kaiserslautern on a free transfer. He made his debut for the team in a 5–1 home league win over St. Pauli on 17 November 2001, starting the match and earning a yellow card in the process, before being substituted in the 81st minute. In April 2002, West was released by the club due to their "total disagreement". He made a total of 10 league appearances in the 2001–02 season.

In August 2002, West trained with English side Manchester City for 10 days. He eventually failed to get a contract due to lack of fitness.

Partizan
On 24 January 2003, it was announced that West will join the reigning FR Yugoslavia champions Partizan. He arrived in Belgrade for the final negotiations with the club five days later. On 30 January 2003, West signed an 18-month contract with Partizan. He made his official debut for the club on 1 March 2003, playing the full 90 minutes in a 4–2 home league victory over Radnički Obrenovac. West scored his first goal for Partizan in a 4–0 home league win over Vojvodina on 7 May 2003. Under Lothar Matthäus, the club convincingly won the 2002–03 First League of Serbia and Montenegro. Afterwards, West was one of the most influential players on the way to helping Partizan reach the group stage of the 2003–04 UEFA Champions League, eliminating Newcastle United on penalties in the third qualifying round. He managed to record three appearances in Group F, despite missing numerous games in the first half of the 2003–04 season due to injuries. In February 2004, West left the club by mutual consent.

Later years
In August 2004, West signed a one-year contract with Qatari club Al-Arabi. He scored his only goal for the side in a 1–1 league draw away at Al-Wakrah on 4 November 2004. West subsequently returned to England, penning a one-year deal with Plymouth Argyle in July 2005. He made his debut for the club on 27 August 2005, picking up a yellow card in a 0–1 loss to Hull City. West appeared in only five games for Plymouth, before his contract was terminated in October 2005.

In January 2007, West was close to signing with Croatian club Rijeka, but failed his medical. He eventually moved to Iran and signed a one-year contract with Paykan in August 2007. West failed to make a start with the club, having his contract terminated by mutual consent only three months later.

In February 2008, West reportedly claimed to be joining Segunda División side Xerez, but the club's president denied any knowledge of the player's arrival.

International career
West was a member of the Flying Eagles at the 1993 African Youth Championship. He then went on to earn 42 full international caps for Nigeria, making his debut in a 1–3 loss to Sweden on 5 May 1994. West was also a member of the Olympic squad that won the gold medal at the 1996 Summer Olympics. He played every single minute of the tournament. Two years later, West was named in the 22-man squad for the 1998 FIFA World Cup, together with Jay-Jay Okocha, Nwankwo Kanu, and others. They reached the second stage of the tournament, being eliminated by Denmark in the round of 16.

In the 2000 African Cup of Nations, West played the full 90 minutes in all of Nigeria's games in the competition, as they finished runners-up to Cameroon. He also represented his country in the tournament's 2002 edition, finishing in third place. Additionally, West was a member of the team at the 2002 FIFA World Cup. He made two appearances in the "Group of Death", as Nigeria finished bottom of the table, behind Sweden, England and Argentina. After the tournament, Nigeria coach Festus Onigbinde blamed West for the team's failure, stating that the player "flouted' his instructions.

In January 2004, West suffered an injury during the team's training session that ruled him out of the African Cup of Nations. He returned to the national team on 17 August 2005, making his final appearance for the Super Eagles in a friendly against Libya.

Style of play
Primarily a centre-back, West was a physically commanding and powerful defender. Although he lacked significant pace, West was known for his ball-winning abilities, commitment, and hard-tackling style of play, as well as his forward surging runs.

Personal life

Religion and beliefs
A devout Christian, West admittedly used charms before games during his professional career as a footballer. He eventually became a pastor after his footballing days. In 2014, West founded a church called "Shelter in the Storm Miracle Ministries of All Nation" in Lagos.

Age controversy
In 2010, it was reported that West and other Nigerian internationals, such as Jay-Jay Okocha, Nwankwo Kanu and Obafemi Martins, were much older than they claimed to be. In April 2013, Žarko Zečević, former FK Partizan general secretary, said that West is 12 years older than his claimed age. Shortly afterwards, West denied the accusation.

Career statistics

Club

International

Honours

Club
Auxerre
 Championnat de France: 1995–96
 Coupe de France: 1993–94, 1995–96

Inter Milan
 UEFA Cup: 1997–98

Partizan
 First League of Serbia and Montenegro: 2002–03

International
Nigeria
 Olympic Games: 1996
 Africa Cup of Nations: Runner-up 2000

References

External links
 
 
 
 

1. FC Kaiserslautern players
1998 FIFA World Cup players
2000 African Cup of Nations players
2002 African Cup of Nations players
2002 FIFA World Cup players
A.C. Milan players
Age controversies
AJ Auxerre players
Al-Arabi SC (Qatar) players
Association football defenders
Bundesliga players
Derby County F.C. players
Rangers International F.C. players
Expatriate footballers in England
Expatriate footballers in France
Expatriate footballers in Germany
Expatriate footballers in Iran
Expatriate footballers in Italy
Expatriate footballers in Qatar
Expatriate footballers in Serbia and Montenegro
First League of Serbia and Montenegro players
FK Partizan players
Footballers at the 1996 Summer Olympics
Inter Milan players
Bridge F.C. players
Ligue 1 players
Nigeria international footballers
Nigerian expatriate footballers
Nigerian expatriate sportspeople in England
Nigerian expatriate sportspeople in France
Nigerian expatriate sportspeople in Germany
Nigerian expatriate sportspeople in Iran
Nigerian expatriate sportspeople in Italy
Nigerian expatriate sportspeople in Qatar
Nigerian expatriate sportspeople in Serbia and Montenegro
Nigerian footballers
Nigeria Professional Football League players
Olympic footballers of Nigeria
Olympic gold medalists for Nigeria
Olympic medalists in football
Plymouth Argyle F.C. players
Premier League players
Qatar Stars League players
Serie A players
Sharks F.C. players
Sportspeople from Port Harcourt
UEFA Cup winning players
1974 births
Living people
Medalists at the 1996 Summer Olympics